The Borel-Boccaccio Type 3000, also known as Borel C2, was a two-seat fighter designed and built in France to a 1918 C2 specification.

Design and development
In 1918 Borel responded to two specifications for fighter aircraft, one single seat with provision for a rear gunner and another two-seater. Two almost identical designs emerged to meet these specifications, the Borel C1 and Borel C2.

Borel C1
The C1 was  designed with two fixed synchronised machine-guns, or a single machine-gun with a  cannon firing through the propeller boss. Two additional machine-guns were also proposed, fired by a second crewman seated behind the pilot, known as a single-seat protégé, which mirrored the C2 specification. Development of the sole C1 was abandoned with the armistice in favour of the almost identical C2.

Borel C2 / Borel-Boccaccio Type 3000
The C2 was a two-seat fighter very similar to the C1 but with a gun ring in a separate cockpit behind the pilot and a revised cabane strut arrangement. The two-bay biplane wings had moderate stagger and were attached to the lower fuselage longerons and to the upper longerons with cabane struts under the centre section. Power was supplied by a  Hispano-Suiza 8Fb driving a 2-bladed wooden propeller with a large spinner. The wooden fuselage was covered in fabric and housed two jettisonable fuel tanks and, initially, a ventral radiator for the closely cowled Hispano-Suiza 8Fb and fixed  Vickers machine-gun. Provision for two cameras was made under the pilots seat and the rear gunner had two  guns on a T.O.3 gun ring.

Testing of the Type 3000 revealed that the aircraft met the armament requirements of the specification and that the structure had a load factor of seven (could withstand 7g). Modifications included replacing the ventral radiator with two Lamblin radiators mounted on the undercarriage legs, shortened exhaust manifolds and an extra strut supporting the tailplane. Despite exceeding the performance requirements the Type 3000 was not ordered for production due to the SPAD S.XX, beating Borel to the post, having been flown and tested in 1918.

Specifications (Type 3000 / C2)

References

1910s French fighter aircraft
Aircraft first flown in 1919
Biplanes
Borel aircraft